The following is a list of stations owned or operated by Sinclair Broadcast Group. Sinclair owns or operates 294 television stations across the United States in 89 markets ranging in size from as large as Washington, D.C. to as small as Ottumwa, Iowa/Kirksville, Missouri. Several of these stations are owned by affiliate companies with varying ties to Sinclair—including Cunningham Broadcasting and Deerfield Media—and operated by Sinclair using local marketing agreements.

Current stations 
Stations are arranged alphabetically by state and by city of license.
 (**) indicates a station that was built and signed-on by Sinclair.

Cunningham Broadcasting

Deerfield Media

Howard Stirk Holdings

Former stations

Television

Radio

Notes

License ownership/operational agreements

Mergers and acquisitions

Satellites and semi-satellites

References

External links 
 Official Website

Sinclair Broadcast Group